There's That Woman Again is a 1938 American comedy mystery film directed by Alexander Hall. It is the sequel to There's Always a Woman, released the same year. In both films, Melvyn Douglas stars as a private investigator whose wife involves herself in his work. Joan Blondell played the wife in the first film, but that role went to Virginia Bruce in this one.

Plot
Private detective Bill Reardon (Melvyn Douglas) is awakened one morning by his dizzy wife, Sally (Virginia Bruce), who can't remember what the string tied to her finger is supposed to remind her of.

While discussing the unfortunate financial condition of their private detective agency during breakfast, an executive of a jewelry story, Mr. Stone (Reardon's only client) calls him and demands to know why he hasn't shown up for an important meeting to discuss the recent robberies the store has experienced. Sally Reardon was supposed to give her husband a message about the meeting (which explains the string on her finger).

Reardon hurries off to meet with Mr. Stone and Mr. Davis (the jewelry store executives), along with Mrs. Nacelle (the wife of the rich owner of the store). Reardon informs them that he has a solid suspect for the crimes, a clerk named Charles Crenshaw (Gordon Oliver).

Meanwhile, Charles Crenshaw shows up at the Reardon Detective agency and wants to hire them to find out why he's being followed by an unknown man who recently searched his apartment. Sally Reardon pretends to be one of the agency's detectives, hoping to help her husband's failing business. She accepts Crenshaw's case.

Crenshaw is unaware that the man who followed him and searched is apartment was actually Bill Reardon himself, since he thinks Crenshaw is the thief.

That afternoon, Bill Reardon has lunch with the attractive Mrs. Nacelle (Margaret Lindsay), who informs him that her husband took over the jewelry store from Mr. Davis because he owed her husband money.  Mrs. Nacelle thinks Davis resents losing the store, and she suggests that he might be the thief.

Sally Reardon shows up at the restaurant and overhears her husband say that Charles Crenshaw (the agency's newest client) is also the chief suspect for the jewel thefts!  Believing Crenshaw is innocent, Sally quickly leaves the restaurant so she can call the young clerk at the jewelry store and warn him.  Soon afterwards, Bill Reardon and his agents apprehend Crenshaw.

That evening the Reardon's join Mr. and Mrs. Nacelle for dinner at a posh nightclub. The jewelry store's manager and former owner (Davis) is seen leaving the nightclub, and he deliberated picks up a note at the hat check stand which was left for Tony Croy (Stanley Ridges), a known mob boss.  Moments later Tony Croy arrives and asks the hat check girl if there's a note for him, but the girl says it was just picked up by another man who claimed to be Mr. Croy.

Davis leaves in a cab, and Croy jumps into a cab to follow him. In the cab, Davis reads the note he stole, which gives the location of some unnamed object located in a specific filing cabinet at the jewelry store. Davis goes to the jewelry store to find out what the note refers to, but he's shot by an unseen assailant.

Meanwhile, back at the nightclub, Sally devises a harebrained scheme to help clear Crenshaw of the robberies by stealing something from the jewelry store while Crenshaw is still in jail, which would prove he was not the culprit.  Using the keys she takes from Mrs. Nacelle's purse, she goes to the jewelry store and steals several items from a display case.

The next morning at the crime scene, the police detectives are busy collecting evidence. Bill Reardon secretly finds the note that Davis brought to the store the night before, and Reardon realizes that it's connected to the case.

Bill and Sally Reardon eventually discover that Tony Croy and Mrs. Nacelle were married some years earlier, but never got divorced. Croy has been blackmailing Mrs. Nacelle with this info, forcing her to steal the jewelry from her husband's store. When Croy comes to Mrs. Nacelles mansion to collect the stolen jewels, 
Mrs. Nacelle tricks him by having him open a safe which is rigged to fire a gun attached to a device inside.

Back at the jewelry store, Bill shows the police detectives that Mr. Davis was actually killed by a trick gun which fired from inside the file drawer when it was opened — the same trick Mrs. Nacelle used inside her home wall safe. The rigged filling cabinet drawer was meant to kill Croy, the man who was supposed to get the note which gave directions to that particular file drawer.

Bill and Sally Reardon set a trap for Mrs. Nacelle, solve the case, and lead the police to the final showdown with the murderous wife.

Cast
 Melvyn Douglas as William "Bill" Reardon
 Virginia Bruce as Sally Reardon
 Margaret Lindsay as Mrs. Nacelle
 Stanley Ridges as Tony Croy
 Gordon Oliver as Charles Crenshaw
 Tom Dugan as Flannigan
 Don Beddoe as Johnson
 Jonathan Hale as Rolfe Davis
 Pierre Watkin as Mr. Nacelle
 Paul Harvey as Stone
 Lillian Yarbo as Ladies Room Attendant (uncredited)

Reception
In The New York Times, Frank Nugent described it as "a crudely jointed mystery film", but conceded "it's a harmless way of killing time."

References

External links
 
 
 
 

American black-and-white films
American crime comedy films
Columbia Pictures films
Films based on short fiction
Films directed by Alexander Hall
1930s comedy mystery films
1930s crime comedy films
American sequel films
American comedy mystery films
1938 comedy films
1938 films
1930s American films